M97 or M-97 may refer to:

 Messier 97, a planetary nebula in the constellation Ursa Major
 Winchester Model 1897, a pump-action shotgun
 M-97 (Michigan highway), a state highway in Michigan
 Morehead-Rowan County Clyde A. Thomas Regional Airport (FAA LID: M97), a public airport located northwest of Morehead, Kentucky, United States